Body and Soul is the tenth studio album by English electronic band Cabaret Voltaire, released in March 1991 by Belgium-based label Les Disques du Crépuscule. Music historian Colin Larkin wrote that the album was "well-received" and "consolidated Cabaret Voltaire's pivotal position on the UK's dance scene". Martin Aston in Q Magazine called the album "nothing radical but by their own standards, a rewarding leap sideways."

Composition 

All tracks are composed, arranged and produced by Richard H. Kirk and Stephen Mallinder at Western Works, Sheffield, England.

Content 

The release features cover art by Jerome B-Patou.

This album was the last to feature Stephen Mallinder's lead vocals.

Release 

Body and Soul was released in March 1991 by Belgium-based label Les Disques du Crépuscule on vinyl, CD and cassette.

Track listing
All tracks composed and arranged by Richard H. Kirk and Stephen Mallinder.

1. "No Resistance" – 6:22
2. "Shout" – 6:43
3. "Happy" – 6:21
4. "Decay" – 2:23
5. "Bad Chemistry" – 6:14
6. "Vibration" – 7:12
7. "What is Real" – 7:07
8. "Western Land" – 3:18
9. "Don't Walk Away" (CD bonus track) – 5:17
10. "Alien Nation Funk" (CD bonus track) – 7:07
11. "What is Real (Dreamtime Mix)" (CD bonus track) – 7:03

Personnel
Cabaret Voltaire

 Stephen Mallinder – vocals, keyboards
 Richard H. Kirk – keyboards and computer-generated instrumentation

References

External links 

 

Cabaret Voltaire (band) albums
1991 albums